Rufus Palen (February 25, 1807 – April 26, 1844) was an American manufacturer and politician in the U.S. state of New York. He represented New York in the United States House of Representatives.

Biography
Palen was born in Palenville, New York and moved with his family as a child to Fallsburg. He received limited schooling and became engaged in the tanning and manufacture of leather as head of Rufus Palen & Co., and a partner in Knapp & Palen, Palen & Flagler, and other companies.  In addition, he was a partner in a general store under the company name Palen Foster & Co., and was active in other business ventures.

He held several political offices in New York, including postmaster of Palenville, and town board member, school supervisor, and district highway overseer for Fallsburg.  He was elected as a Whig to the Twenty-sixth Congress, serving from March 4, 1839 – March 3, 1841.

Palen contracted tuberculosis during his term in Congress, and spent much of his time afterwards traveling outside the United States in an effort to improve his health.  He died in New York City on April 26, 1844.  He is interred in the Old Cemetery in Palenville, New York.

Notes

External links

	

1807 births
1844 deaths
People from Fallsburg, New York
People from Catskill, New York
New York (state) postmasters
School board members in New York (state)
Town supervisors in New York (state)
Whig Party members of the United States House of Representatives from New York (state)
19th-century American politicians